The 2001 Copa Mercosur Finals were the two-legged final that decided the winner of the 2001 Copa Mercosur, the fourth (and last) edition of the Copa Mercosur, South America's international club football tournament organized by CONMEBOL.

The finals were contested in two-legged home-and-away format between Argentinian team San Lorenzo de Almagro and Brazilian team Flamengo. The first leg was hosted by Flamengo at Maracanã Stadium in Rio de Janeiro on 22 November 2017, while the second leg was hosted by San Lorenzo at its own venue, Estadio Pedro Bidegain in Buenos Aires on 24 January 2002.

The second leg had originally been scheduled for December 19, but it had to be postponed to January 24, 2002 due to social unrest in Argentina.

After both matches ended tied on 90 minutes (0–0 the first game and 1–1 the second one), the winner was decided by penalty shoot-out, with San Lorenzo winning the series 4–3 and also winning its first international title organised by CONMEBOL (the first international had been in 1927 when San Lorenzo won Copa Aldao, organised by Argentine and Uruguayan Associations together). Goalkeeper Sebastián Saja was one of the keyplayers of the final, after stopping two penalties and converting one himself in the shoot-out, while Diego Capria kicked (and scored) the last penalty to make San Lorenzo win the series.

Teams

Venues

Format 
The finals were played on a home-and-away two-legged basis, with the higher-seeded team hosting the second leg. If tied on aggregate, neither the away goals rule nor 30 minutes of extra time would be used. Instead, the penalty shoot-out would be used to determine the winner.

Matches

First leg

Second leg

References

Copa Mercosur
m
m
m
m
M